Greg Boyer or Gregory Boyer may refer to:

 Greg Boyer (musician) (born 1958), American trombonist
 Greg Boyer (water polo) (born 1958), American Olympic silver medalist in water polo